Bubbles is a 1930 American Vitaphone Varieties short film released by Warner Bros. in Technicolor. It was filmed in December 1929 at the First National Pictures studio with Western Electric apparatus, an early sound-on-film system, Rel. No. 3898. Bubbles is one of the earliest surviving recordings of Judy Garland on film, at 8 years old.

Content
A Vitaphone short film directed by Roy Mack, Bubbles features a land of make-believe where The Vitaphone Kiddies perform seven short singing, dancing and acrobatic acts. The opening act is Marjorie Kane singing "My Pretty Bubble". The second act is Judy Garland and her two older sisters, then known collectively as The Gumm Sisters, singing "In the Land of Let's Pretend", a song from Warner Bros' 1929 film On with the Show!, with Garland singing a short solo. Five more brief acts follow, including a tap dancing number in ballet pointe shoes.

Cast
Judy Garland as herself
Mary Jane Gumm as herself
Dorothy Virginia Gumm as herself
Marjorie Kane as Mother in Checkered Dress
The Vitaphone Kiddies as Themselves

Preservation status
This short film now exists in black and white through copies made for television syndication, and was included as an extra on the 2004 deluxe DVD edition of Meet Me in St. Louis (1944).

Bubbles was one of the shorts included in the 1994 LaserDisc version of Judy Garland - The Golden Years at M-G-M. The audio from the movie of Garland's song is included in the 2010 CD set Judy Garland – Lost Tracks 1929 - 1959.

References

External links 
 Bubbles at IMDB
 In the Land of Let's Pretend (song, audio)

1930 musical films
Vitaphone short films
Warner Bros. short films
1930 films
American musical films
Films directed by Roy Mack
1930s English-language films
1930s American films